Henry Otto (August 8, 1877 – August 3, 1952) was an American silent film actor, director, producer, and screenwriter. 
 
Otto contributed to over 150 films throughout his career, working as an actor and a director throughout. He directed many films in 1914, in films such as When a Woman Waits, In Tune, The Archeologist, and The Redemption of a Pal working with actors such as Edward Coxen, Charlotte Burton and George Field. He retired from film in 1942. 

Otto was found dead on August 4, 1952, in Los Angeles.

Selected filmography

Actor
 Harbor Island (1912, Short) - General Arieno - Owner of Harbor Island
 The Lipton Cup: Introducing Sir Thomas Lipton (1913)
 Margarita and the Mission Funds (1913, Short) - Padre Sandez of the Mission
 Through the Centuries (1914, Short) - Amos Willing
 Elizabeth's Prayer (1914) - Richard Lee, A Sporty Acquaintance
 The Zaca Lake Mystery (1915, Short) - The Hunter
 Half a Rogue (1916) - Ex-Senator Henderson
 Mister 44 (1916) - Dick Westfall
 Lorelei of the Sea (1917) - John Grey
 The Outlaw Express (1926) - John Mills
 The Iron Mask (1929) - The King's Valet
 The Quitter (1929) - Dr. Abott
 One Hysterical Night (1929) - Dr. Hayden
 Sea Devils (1931) - Governor
 Svengali (1931) - Man with Opera Glasses (uncredited)
 Beware of Ladies (1936) - Plainclothesman (uncredited)
 The 13th Man (1937) - One Punch (uncredited)
 Here's Flash Casey (1938) - Dock Warden (uncredited)
 Silver Queen (1942) - Fight Spectator (uncredited)
 Sweet Rosie O'Grady (1943) - Minor Role (uncredited) (final film role)

Director
 Betty's Bandit (1912)
 Beppo (1914)
 The Measure of Leon Du Bray (1915)
 Undine (1916)
 The River of Romance (1916)
 Mister 44 (1916)
 Big Tremaine (1916)
 The River of Romance (1916)
 The Butterfly Girl (1917)
 Their Honeymoon Baby (1918)
 Wild Life (1918)
 The Island of Intrigue (1919)
 The Amateur Adventuress (1919)
 The Great Romance (1919)
 Fair and Warmer (1919)
 The Microbe (1919)
 The Great Victory (1919)
 The Willow Tree (1920)
 The Cheater (1920)
 A Slave of Vanity (1920)
 Lovebound (1923)
 The Temple of Venus (1923)
 Dante's Inferno (1924)
 The Folly of Vanity (1924)
 The Ancient Mariner (1925)
 Alma de Gaucho (1930)

Writer
 Memories of the Past (1911)
 Oh, Such a Night! (1912)
 All on Account of a Transfer (1913)
 Lola (Scenario, 1914)
 The Phantom Fortune (Scenario, 1915)
 Half a Rogue (Scenario, 1916)
 The River of Romance (Scenario, 1916)
 Big Tremaine (1916)
 A Slave of Vanity (Scenario, 1920)
 The Temple of Venus (Story, 1923)

References

External links

 

1877 births
1952 deaths
American male film actors
American male silent film actors
American male screenwriters
Film producers from New York (state)
Silent film directors
Male actors from New York City
20th-century American male actors
Screenwriters from New York (state)
20th-century American male writers
Writers from New York City
Film producers from Missouri
Film directors from New York City
Film directors from Missouri
Male actors from St. Louis
Writers from St. Louis
20th-century American screenwriters